Pottawatomie County is the name of several counties in the United States:
 Pottawattamie County, Iowa
 Pottawatomie County, Kansas
 Pottawatomie County, Oklahoma